Lee Dong-jun (born 1 February 1997) is a South Korean professional footballer who plays as a winger for Jeonbuk Hyundai Motors.

Club career
Lee signed with Busan IPark on 21 February 2017. He made his debut on 25 March in a 1–0 defeat to Bucheon FC.

Lee featured primarily as a substitute in his first two years with the club, but became a first team regular under new manager Cho Deok-je. Lee appeared in every league game in 2019 as Busan finished second in the K League 2 and achieved promotion via the playoffs. Lee scored 13 goals and contributed seven assists to be named as the league's MVP.

On 29 January 2022, Lee signed a contract with German club Hertha BSC until 2025.

On 22 December 2022, Lee agreed to return to Korea and signed a contract with Jeonbuk Hyundai Motors beginning on 1 January 2023.

International career
In January 2020, Lee featured for Korea in the AFC Under-23 Championship. Lee scored against Iran and China in the group stages as Korea went on to win the tournament to qualify for the 2020 Olympic Games. He made his debut for South Korea national football team on 25 March 2021 in a friendly against Japan.

Career statistics

Honours
Individual
K League 2 Best XI: 2019
K League 2 Most Valuable Player: 2019
K League 1 Best XI: 2021

References

1997 births
Living people
Association football midfielders
Sportspeople from Busan
South Korean footballers
South Korea under-20 international footballers
South Korea under-23 international footballers
South Korea international footballers
Busan IPark players
Ulsan Hyundai FC players
Hertha BSC players
Jeonbuk Hyundai Motors players
K League 1 players
K League 2 players
K League 2 Most Valuable Player Award winners
Bundesliga players
Footballers at the 2020 Summer Olympics
Olympic footballers of South Korea
South Korean expatriate footballers
Expatriate footballers in Germany
South Korean expatriate sportspeople in Germany